White Christmas is a Christmas album by Al Green, first released in 1983. It is his 18th studio album. The album has been reissued under different titles, and sometimes with different sequencing.

Track listing
"White Christmas" - 2:33
"The Christmas Song" - 3:27
"Winter Wonderland" - 2:05
"I'll Be Home for Christmas" - 3:13
"Jingle Bells" (P.D.) - 1:58
"What Christmas Means to Me" (Mosea Dillard, Claude Hill, Sharon Michalsky, Chiquita Mullins) - 3:45
"Oh Holy Night" (P.D.) - 3:41
"Silent Night" (Morton Gould) - 3:18
"It Feels Like Christmas" (Al Green) - 3:20

Personnel 
Musicians
 Al Green – lead vocals
 Jesse Butler – keyboards 
 Carl Marsh – synthesizers 
 Thomas Bingham – guitars 
 Moses Dillard – guitars
 Ray Griffin – bass 
 Steve Potts – drums 
 Archie Jordan – strings
 Debra Carter – backing vocals 
 Harvey Jones – backing vocals 
 Linda Jones – backing vocals 

Arrangements
 Al Green – string arrangements (1, 2, 3, 7, 9), BGV arrangements
 Moses Dillard – rhythm arrangements, string arrangements (1, 2, 3, 7, 9)
 Lloyd Barry – synthesizer arrangements, string arrangements (1, 4, 5, 6, 8)
 Chris McDonald – music copyist

Production 
 Moses Dillard – producer 
 Al Green – executive producer 
 Paul Zaleski – engineer, remixing 
 Rob Dickinson – assistant engineer 
 Hank Williams – mastering at MasterMix (Nashville, Tennessee)
 McConnell Graphics – art direction 
 Mark Tucker – photography

References

1983 Christmas albums
Christmas albums by American artists
Al Green albums
Rhythm and blues Christmas albums
Gospel Christmas albums